Donna Schaibley (born November 15, 1953) is an American politician who has served in the Indiana House of Representatives from the 24th district since 2014.

References

1953 births
Living people
Republican Party members of the Indiana House of Representatives
21st-century American politicians
21st-century American women politicians
People from Floyd County, Indiana
Women state legislators in Indiana